José Domingo Monterrosa Barrios (4 August 1940 – 23 October 1984) was a military commander of the Armed Forces of El Salvador during the Salvadoran Civil War.

Early life 

José Domingo Monterrosa Barrios was born on 4 August 1940 in Berlín, Usulután, El Salvador. Monterrosa graduated from the Captain General Gerardo Barrios Military School in 1963 and attended the School of the Americas in 1966.

Military career 

In 1969, Monterrosa participated in the Football War against Honduras.

In 1980, he was assigned to become the leader of the Atlácatl Battalion, composed of who considered to be El Salvador's elite soldiers. The Atlácatl Battalion was held responsible for committing the El Mozote massacre in 1981. Monterrosa was allegedly seen arriving by helicopter by a local guide prior to the start of the massacre, as told by reporter Mark Danner; however, Danner also reported that Monterrosa had been contacted by a U.S. military advisor to share the outcome of the battle that had taken place in El Mozote. At that point, Monterrosa was in the Atlácatl's headquarters. According to Danner's story, after the conversation with the U.S. advisor, Monterrosa boarded a helicopter and headed to Morazán. The Washington Post reported in 2007 that Monterrosa had ordered the massacre. El Mozote was a tiny village located North of Morazán.

Monterrosa was known to be obsessed with destroying the pro-rebel Radio Venceremos, which "specialized in ideological propaganda, acerbic commentary, and pointed ridicule of the government". Monterrosa was a supporter of President José Napoleón Duarte's efforts to hold peace talks in 1984, and his death seriously weakened them.

Death 

There are several versions of how Monterrosa was killed. One is that a malfunctioning helicopter crashed and killed its occupants including Monterrosa. Another version states that an FMLN booby trap was set under a fake rebel radio transmitter that Monterrosa took with him as a victory trophy, in 1984. The bomb went off while he was in flight. Remnants of his helicopter can be found in the Museum of the Revolution in Perquin, Morazan department.

Legacy 

The museum of El Salvador's Armed Forces has designated a special section for Monterrosa. After his death in October 1984, the Salvadoran congress honored Monterrosa with the title of "Heroe de Joateca" and declared him a national hero for his service to the country.

In 2019, the new Salvadoran President Nayib Bukele ordered the removal of Monterrosa's name from one of the main military units of the Salvadoran Army. Years earlier, another Salvadoran president, Mauricio Funes, asked for forgiveness from the state and the people of El Salvador for the crimes committed by state actors during the civil war, and directed the Army to review their behavior in those years.

References 

People of the Salvadoran Civil War
Salvadoran military personnel
1984 deaths
1940 births
Salvadoran anti-communists
Captain General Gerardo Barrios Military School alumni